Once Upon a Time... When We Were Colored is a 1996 American period drama film directed by Tim Reid. The screenplay was written by Paul W. Cooper. The film is based on Clifton Taulbert’s real life and his non-fiction book Once Upon a Time When We Were Colored.

Plot
The film takes place in Glen Allan, Mississippi, during the mid-20th century. In the early stages of the film, the audience gains more knowledge regarding Cliff’s upbringing. His biological mother was too young to take care of him and was not able to provide Cliff with financial support therefore he was raised by his extended family. Ma Pearl and Poppa begin to take care of him but after a couple of years, Ma Ponk begins to take care of Cliff and ultimately raises him, with the help of Poppa.

Ma Ponk, Poppa, and Cliff are the three main characters in the film. Another scene that occurs early on in the film which helps to portray the racial climate during the 1950s in the South, is when Cliff and Poppa attend a parade hosted by the Ku Klux Klan and are confronted for being African Americans by a violent Ku Klux Klan member. As the film progresses, it is known that Cliff lives in a low-income, rural place where almost every adult is a laborer, most commonly a field worker. This is known when the narrator mentions that Cliff attends school in a single bungalow where his classmates are the children of servants, illiterate farm workers, poor field workers, and maids. Even his caregiver, Ma Ponk works in a cotton field picking cotton for a white farmer.

Also, the majority of the people living in this small town are part of a Christian church where at times they come together and unite to stay strong against the social injustices placed upon them. Ma Ponk is religious and is an active participant in her local Christian church. As she is a faithful member, she attends meeting regularly and is part of the church’s gospel choir. As the film progresses even more, the audience has the chance to see Cliff grow up into a hard-working young man with positive aspirations of becoming more educated. Cliff begins working for an older white woman, Ms. Mavory, who begins to show an interest in educating and enlightening Cliff. She asks him if he likes to read and he says yes therefore she then begins to make trips to the local library and checks out books for Cliff to read, which he otherwise would not have access to.

One book that she checks out for Cliff is Homer's Iliad. Cliff reads it and mentions to Cleve that he actually enjoys reading the book. The fact that Cliff enjoys reading great classics and strives to excel in school shows that he does want to make a positive change in himself and in society. He does not make a radical change but instead makes a subtle positive change by choosing to work hard and continue his education. When Cliff grows older and finishes his high school education, he leaves his hometown to migrate North. He leaves the South in hope of finding a better life and reaching his dreams.

Cast

Reception
On review aggregator website Rotten Tomatoes, the film holds an approval rating of 71% based on 14 reviews. Roger Ebert gave the movie four stars of four.

References

External links
 

1996 films
American biographical films
African-American films
Films set in Mississippi
Films based on biographies
Films shot in North Carolina
African-American drama films
1996 directorial debut films
1990s English-language films
1990s American films